Ruby Joy Gabriel (born 22 November 1994) is a Palauan female sprinter who competed in the 100 metres event at the 2012 Summer Olympics.

Achievements

References

External links
 
Sports reference biography

1994 births
Living people
Palauan female sprinters
Olympic track and field athletes of Palau
Athletes (track and field) at the 2012 Summer Olympics
People from Koror
Palauan female hurdlers